Greasy Love Songs is a compilation album by Frank Zappa, released in 2010. The album consists of the original vinyl mix of Cruising with Ruben & the Jets (1968), with bonus material, including previously unreleased tracks from the original sessions, the single version of "Jelly Roll Gum Drop", and "audio documentary" material. The album is designated as a "Project/Object Audio Documentary". It is project/object #3 in a series of 40th Anniversary FZ Audio Documentaries, following MOFO (2006) and Lumpy Money (2009).

Track listing

References

2010 compilation albums
Frank Zappa compilation albums
The Mothers of Invention albums
Zappa Records albums
Doo-wop albums